Gordon Freeman is the silent protagonist of the Half-Life video game series, created by Gabe Newell and designed by Newell and Marc Laidlaw of Valve. His first appearance is in Half-Life. Gordon Freeman is depicted as a bespectacled Caucasian man from Seattle, with brown hair and a signature goatee, who graduated from MIT with a PhD in theoretical physics. He was an employee at the fictional Black Mesa Research Facility. Controlled by the player, Gordon is often tasked with using a wide range of weapons and tools to fight alien creatures such as headcrabs, as well as Combine machines and soldiers.

Gordon Freeman's character has been well received by critics and gamers, and various gaming websites often consider him to be one of the greatest video game characters of all time, including UGO and GameSpot.

Character design

Half-Life director Gabe Newell coined the name "Gordon Freeman" during a conversation with the game's writer Marc Laidlaw in his car. Laidlaw had originally named the character "Dyson Poincaré", combining the names of physicist and philosopher Freeman Dyson and mathematician Henri Poincaré. The texture for Gordon's head was "too big of a job for just one person", so Valve designers combined references from four people. An earlier model of Gordon, known as "Ivan the Space Biker", had a full beard that was subsequently trimmed. Other iterations of Gordon's concept featured different glasses, a ponytail, and a helmet.

Gordon wears a special full-body hazmat suit, known as the Hazardous Environment Suit (or HEV Suit). The suit is designed to protect the user from radiation, energy discharges, and blunt trauma during the handling of hazardous materials. The suit's main feature is its "high-impact reactive armor", an electrically powered armor system that, when charged, absorbs two-thirds of the damage that Gordon would ordinarily suffer in Half-Life and 80% in Half-Life 2. A fully charged suit can survive several dozen hits from small arms and even one direct hit from an RPG. The suit can be charged by various means, and has its own oxygen supply and medical injectors, such as morphine and a neurotoxin antidote. It comes with a built-in flashlight, a radio, various tracking devices, a compass, and a Geiger counter. The suit contains an on-board computer system that constantly monitors the user's health and vital signs, and reacts to any changes in the user's condition. It also projects a heads-up display (HUD) which displays Gordon's health and suit charge level, remaining ammunition, and a crosshair. As a means of immersing the player in the role, Gordon never speaks, and there are no cutscenes or mission briefings—all action is viewed through Gordon's eyes, with the player retaining control of Gordon's actions at nearly all times. The images of Gordon are only seen on the game's cover and menu pages, and also in advertisements, making them marketing tools rather than pictures of what Gordon is "really like". Gabe Newell has stated that Valve sees no reason to give Gordon a voice.

In Half-Life, Gordon wears the Mark IV suit. Later in the game, the suit is equipped with an optional long-jump module so Gordon can leap great distances. It is charged using power modules throughout Black Mesa. In Half-Life 2 Gordon receives the upgraded Mark V suit, which lacks the long-jump module but gains several new abilities. It features a visual zooming capability, limited sprinting, an anti-venom injector, an optional ammo and health counter on the crosshair, and has been modified to use Combine power nodes to charge the suit.

The Mark V initially used a single power source for the flashlight, sprinting, and oxygen supply; in Half-Life 2: Episode Two the flashlight was given a separate power source to improve gameplay. The symbol on Gordon's HEV suit is the lower case Greek letter Lambda, λ. This symbol is used by scientists to denote the decay constant of radioactive elements (related to the half-life of an element). As well as appearing on Gordon's suit, the symbol replaces the letter "a" in the game title (Hλlf-Life), and is the name of the complex in the Black Mesa Research Facility where teleportation experiments are conducted in the first game. The Lambda symbol is also seen in Half-Life 2 as a marking of the human resistance, seen close to hidden supplies and on the arm bands of better equipped resistance fighters.

Fictional biography

Background and skills

A Seattle native, Gordon exhibited an early interest in theoretical physics, especially quantum mechanics and the theory of relativity. His childhood heroes were Albert Einstein, Stephen Hawking, and Richard Feynman. After observing a series of teleportation experiments conducted by the Institute for Experimental Physics at the University of Innsbruck, the transmission of matter became Gordon's obsession. Gordon has no known dependents. He graduated from the Massachusetts Institute of Technology with a Ph.D. degree in Theoretical Physics. His doctoral thesis on the teleportation of matter through extremely dense elements was titled Observation of Einstein-Podolsky-Rosen Entanglement on Supraquantum Structures by Induction Through Nonlinear Transuranic Crystal of Extremely Long Wavelength (ELW) Pulse from Mode-Locked Source Array. Gordon's research into science eventually led him to accept a job offer by the Black Mesa Research Facility, and begin working on a top-secret research project headed by his mentor at MIT, Dr. Isaac Kleiner. He takes up residence at Black Mesa, conducting nuclear and subatomic research in its Anomalous Materials department. Despite his education as a theoretical physicist, the work Freeman is involved with at Black Mesa is of a more experimental nature.

The games often make light of the fact that the tasks Gordon performs amount to little more than manual labor, despite his qualifications. Gordon's assigned job at the start of Half-Life consists of simply pressing a button and pushing a cart. Barney Calhoun wryly notes this irony at the beginning of Half-Life 2, when Freeman performs similar "technical" assistance by flipping a switch and returning a plug to its socket.

A silent protagonist, Gordon does not say a single word during the entire Half-Life saga. Although as proficient as the player with weapons and explosives, Freeman had not actually handled any weapons until some cursory training at the Black Mesa Research Facility's Hazard Course.

Half-Life
In Half-Life, Gordon Freeman is part of a research team performing an experiment that inadvertently creates an inter-dimensional rift in spacetime. Intelligent (and confused) alien lifeforms from the Xen dimension come pouring through multiple breaches inside the Black Mesa facility, attacking anyone in sight. As scientific, military and civilian personnel fall under the alien onslaught, Freeman finds himself targeted not only by the alien monsters, but also the Hazardous Environment Combat Unit (HECU), a U.S. Marine Corps military force sent to contain the situation.

The untrained theoretical physicist somehow manages to survive the chaos, impressing the few surviving scientists and security guards with his heroic acts, while quickly becoming the HECU's high-priority target. Freeman is eventually transported to Xen by a few surviving Lambda Sector scientists. After the successful elimination of the alien leader Nihilanth, Freeman meets the G-Man, who has been remotely observing Freeman throughout the entire Black Mesa Incident. He briefly teleports Freeman to several locations throughout Earth and Xen, ending on a train (much like how the game begins) where he offers Freeman a choice, either agree to work for him and his mysterious "employers" or be left to die on Xen.

The two expansions for Half-Life feature different playable characters and take place during the events of the main game, and as such Gordon is seen at certain points of the games. In these appearances, Gordon maintains his silence, even though he is not the protagonist. In Half-Life: Opposing Force, Adrian Shephard only encounters Gordon once when he witnesses Gordon teleport to Xen in the Lambda Complex. Attempts to follow him through the same portal will result in a "temporal paradox" which sends Shephard falling through Xen's void and ends the game. Gordon is also seen three times by Barney Calhoun during the course of Half-Life: Blue Shift. Barney first sees Gordon passing by in a tram at the beginning of the game, later heading towards the HEV storage area through a surveillance camera, and lastly being dragged to a trash compactor by a pair of HECU troops.

Half-Life 2 and Episodes
Half-Life 2 begins as the G-Man speaks to Gordon in a dreamlike scene, after keeping him "in stasis far from Earth, thought, and time itself" for nearly two decades, during which he did not physically age. He comments that "the right man in the wrong place can make all the difference in the world." Gordon is then "point inserted" into a train bound for City 17, to the (mild) surprise of the other passengers. Freeman quickly learns that Earth has been conquered and occupied by the trans-dimensional Combine empire, with a military force powerful enough to have subdued the entirety of Earth's nations within a period of 7 hours. He soon meets up with Barney Calhoun and Alyx Vance, and joins the resistance against the Combine.

During the course of the game, Gordon battles the forces of the Combine in order to free humanity from its grasp. Already famous for his role in the Black Mesa Incident, Gordon quickly develops a legendary reputation among Earth's surviving human populace, who begin to look up to him and refer to him by such messianic titles as "the One Free Man" or "the Opener of the Way." After slaying scores of Combine soldiers and leading an assault against the Combine stronghold of Nova Prospekt, Gordon eventually sparks a full-scale rebellion, in which he becomes a combatant. Gordon infiltrates one of the Combine's footholds on Earth, City 17's Citadel, and destroys it by detonating its Dark Energy Reactor.

In doing so, he also prevents antagonist Dr. Wallace Breen, the Combine's human representative on Earth and Gordon's former administrator at Black Mesa, from escaping via teleporter, thereby possibly killing him. Although caught in the reactor's explosion along with Alyx Vance, Gordon is rescued by the G-Man (apparently leaving Alyx Vance to face the explosion alone), who tells Freeman that he is impressed with his work and has received "several tempting offers" for his "services." He deposits Freeman back in stasis, this time without giving him "the illusion of free choice".

Half-Life 2: Episode One rejoins Gordon and Alyx Vance, who are separately removed from the G-Man's stasis by the Vortigaunts and rescued a split second before the reactor explosion, greatly displeasing the G-Man. Gordon regains consciousness under a pile of rubble and is found by Alyx and Dog. Their proximity to the Citadel, coupled with its imminent explosion, which would level much of City 17, requires them to go back inside and stabilize the core, stalling the structure's destruction long enough for both themselves and much of the human population to escape. Gordon and Alyx succeed in doing so, but learn that the local Combine forces are attempting to send a distress message for off-world assistance, using the Citadel's destruction to power the transmission.

The Combine consider this a positive, as the subsequent explosion would destroy all of City 17 and much of the surrounding countryside, which has been all but lost to human resistance forces. With a copy of the distress message, Gordon and Alyx escape the Citadel and meet up with Barney and other survivors. The pair escape City 17 via an evacuation train as the Citadel core goes critical, sending out the Combine message. The resulting shockwave derails their train.

In Half-Life 2: Episode Two, Gordon wakes up in the wrecked train and is freed by Alyx, who had earlier escaped the wreckage. A massive superportal is forming over what was once City 17, which will allow the Combine to send an invasion fleet once it is fully formed. The data they carry is the key to destroying it. Gordon and Alyx make their way to White Forest, an apparent Soviet-era missile base turned into a rebel stronghold, where the data can be sent to an orbiting satellite via a rocket, which will allow the resistance to collapse the portal. After Alyx is critically wounded by a Hunter, Gordon assists the Vortigaunts in saving her, their healing ritual giving the G-Man the opportunity to speak to Gordon. During this conversation, the G-Man reveals to Gordon that he saved Alyx from the Black Mesa incident. He also embeds a message in Alyx's brain for her father, Eli: "prepare for unforeseen consequences."

When the duo reaches White Forest, after a run-in with a Combine Advisor, they are reunited with Dr. Kleiner and Dr. Eli Vance, and are formally introduced to Dr. Arne Magnusson, who has taken control of the base. After Gordon seals the silo from a Combine attack, Gordon, Alyx, Dr. Kleiner, and Dr. Eli Vance watch the transmission from Dr. Mossman seen in Episode One, acquired with the stolen Combine data. It reveals that she has located the Borealis, an Aperture Science research vessel which contains something supposedly capable of causing "another Black Mesa." The G-Man compels Alyx to deliver his message, and once Eli sends her away he reveals that he, too, knows of the G-Man, referring to him as "our mutual friend." With the Combine now sending Striders to shoot the rocket down, Magnusson enlists Gordon's aid in stopping them through the use of his special explosive charges known as Magnusson Devices and Gordon's Gravity Gun.

After repelling the attack, the rocket is launched and the portal is destroyed. As Gordon and Alyx prepare to leave for the Borealis in an old helicopter, they are ambushed by Advisors, which kill Eli before Dog forces them to flee. The game ends with Alyx mourning over Eli's body.

Half-Life: Alyx
Unlike previous games in the series (apart from the earlier expansion games), the player does not control Gordon, instead playing as Alyx Vance as she tries to locate him to help overthrow the Combine occupation of Earth. The game takes place five years before Half-Life 2, and Gordon is still being held in stasis by the G-Man. At the end of the game, Alyx reaches a Combine prison that she believes to contain Gordon and she releases its occupant, only to discover it is the G-Man.

The G-Man shows Alyx the future, with her crying over Eli's body at the end of Episode 2. The G-Man gives her the opportunity to change the future by killing the Combine Advisor that kills her father. She does so, and the G-Man is impressed, saying that she would be more capable of completing his missions than "a previous hire who was unable - or unwilling" to do so. As he says this, he holds a crowbar, before standing to the side to reveal Gordon, who bends down to pick up his glasses, in the first appearance of the character in the series from a third-person perspective. The G-Man then forces Alyx into stasis, awaiting a mission to be assigned to her.

After the end credits, the player now has control of Gordon at the end of Episode 2, albeit with the changed events caused by the G-Man. Eli is furious that Alyx has disappeared, and knows that it must be the G-Man that has taken her. The G-Man can in fact be seen watching events from a balcony at the side of the room, unbeknownst to Eli. Dog jumps in through the window behind him and holds out Gordon's crowbar in his hand. Eli takes it, hands it to Gordon and says "we've got work to do."

Reception
Gordon Freeman quickly became and then remained one of the most popular video game characters ever. In 2008, The Age ranked him as the 16th-best Xbox hero of all time, adding that "no one has done more for the reputations and street cred of theoretical physicists than Valve." In 2009, GameDaily listed the "strong and silent type" in their top 25 video game archetypes, using Gordon Freeman as an example. In 2010, Empire ranked him as the number one Greatest Video Game Character, commenting that "the character is the quintessential geek fantasy" who "has become a gaming icon, synonymous with the apotheosis of first-person action."

He was also ranked 14th on UGO.com's list of top 100 heroes in all media, with a comment that "an MIT graduate, donning black-framed glasses and a goatee, he's not the guy you'd picture decimating the alien threat." In 2012, GamesRadar ranked him as the sixth "most memorable, influential, and badass" protagonist in games, adding: "It's how the characters of the Half-Life universe treat Gordon Freeman, not the way he treats them, that shape such a compelling character." In 2013, Complex ranked him as the 45th "most badass" video game character of all time. On the other hand, 1UP.com's Marty Sliva included him among the most unrelatable narrators, stating, "I'm sure some people love the fact that they can become Gordon Freeman -- I just think I'd be a little happier if there was anything there to become."

In 1998, readers of GameSpot ranked him as the fifth-Best Hero of gaming. In 2009, a public poll on GameSpot resulted in him being voted the All Time Greatest Video Game Hero. He was also voted as the eighth-best video game character of all time in the Guinness World Records Gamer's Edition 2011.

References

Further reading

External links
 
 Gordon Freeman on Combine OverWiki, an external wiki

Fictional American people in video games
Fictional characters displaced in time
Fictional characters from Seattle
Fictional gunfighters in video games
Fictional Massachusetts Institute of Technology people
Fictional revolutionaries
Fictional scientists in video games
Fictional sole survivors
Fictional theoretical physicists
Freeman Dyson
Half-Life characters
Male characters in video games
Silent protagonists
Video game characters based on real people
Video game characters introduced in 1998
Video game mascots
Video game protagonists